East Perth is an inner suburb of Perth, Western Australia, located next to the Perth central business district.  Claise Brook and Claisebrook Cove are within the suburb. Formerly characterised by industrial land uses and urban blight, the redevelopment of East Perth was, and remains, the largest inner-city urban renewal project in the state. The design of the new residential neighbourhoods was strongly influenced by the new urbanism movement.

Land use
Primarily an industrial area in the early twentieth century, it was the location of the East Perth Gas Works, East Perth Power Station (which was decommissioned and the building is being renovated for other purposes), the East Perth railway yard, and engine sheds.

From the early 1980s, virtually all of the residential real estate on the western side of Lord Street became home to commercial enterprises; the buildings remain, either single or duplex dwellings previously inhabited mostly by migrant families.

Population
In the 2016 Census, there were 10,596 people in East Perth. 30.3% of people were born in Australia. The most common countries of birth were England 6.7%, China 4.0%, India 3.7%, Malaysia 3.4% and South Korea 2.9%. 47.6% of people only spoke English at home. Other languages spoken at home included Mandarin 6.6%, Korean 2.7%, Cantonese 2.6%, Portuguese 2.0% and Spanish 1.9%. The most common responses for religion were No Religion 33.3% and Catholic 18.4%.

Cemetery

East Perth is the location of Perth's significant early colonial era cemetery, which contains graves of many early colonial families.  Its condition is marginal due to the loss of many headstones and lack of adequate record of graves, only 800 of the estimated 10,000 grave sites have been identified.

Railway
The former East Perth railway yard and engine sheds were removed in the 1960s and have been redeveloped into the Railway headquarters - consolidating a very scattered system of offices and sections for the railways.

East Perth serves as the main hub for country and interstate rail services and Road Coach services. Departing from the station are services such as the Prospector, AvonLink, tourist trains, and the Indian Pacific.

The original East Perth railway station is now called Claisebrook, and while it has the same number of platforms that it did in the 1960s, the original buildings have given way to modern shelters.

It is also the location of the Goongoongup Bridge on the railway to Bunbury for the South Western Railway.

Redevelopment Authority
East Perth Redevelopment Authority (EPRA) was established in 1991 to manage the redevelopment and urbanisation of the suburb. In 2012 EPRA merged with other redevelopment authorities to become the Metropolitan Redevelopment Authority (MRA). In 2019, the MRA became part of DevelopmentWA. Many parts of East Perth that have been fully developed have been “normalised”—meaning returned to the City of Perth for administration.

Sports
Sporting attractions include the WACA Ground and Gloucester Park trotting ground.

Education 
Educational facilities include Trinity College, a day school for boys, years 4–12.

See also
Restaurant Amusé

Notes

References
 Bodycoat, Ronald. (1993) East Perth heritage study : prepared for the East Perth Development Authority East Perth, W.A. The Authority. 2 volumes (Volume 1 only held in Battye Library).

 
Suburbs of Perth, Western Australia

Suburbs in the City of Vincent
New Urbanism communities